Jonathan Hernández (born July 6, 1996) is a Dominican-American professional baseball pitcher for the Texas Rangers of Major League Baseball (MLB). He made his MLB debut in 2019.

Career
Hernández signed with the Texas Rangers as an international free agent on January 30, 2013 for a $300,000 signing bonus. He spent the 2013 and 2014 seasons playing for the Dominican Summer League Rangers. He spent the 2015 season with the Arizona Rangers of the Rookie-level Arizona League, going 1–1 with a 3.00 ERA in 45 innings. He spent the 2016 season with the Hickory Crawdads of the Class A South Atlantic League, going 10–9 with a 4.56 ERA in  innings.

Hernández started the 2017 season with the Hickory Crawdads of the Class A South Atlantic League and was promoted to the Down East Wood Ducks of the Class A-Advanced Carolina League. He was chosen to represent the Rangers in the All-Star Futures Game. He combined for a 5–11 record with a 4.03 ERA over  innings in 2017. The Rangers added him to their 40-man roster after the 2017 season. He began the 2018 season with the Wood Ducks, and received a midseason promotion to the Frisco RoughRiders of the Class AA Texas League. Hernández posted a 4–2 record with a 2.20 ERA, with 77 strikeouts in  innings in 10 games (10 starts) with the Wood Ducks. In 12 games (12 starts) with Frisco, he posted a 4–4 record with a 4.92 ERA and 57 strikeouts in 64 innings. The Rangers optioned Hernández to Frisco to open the 2019 season, 
and he went 5–9 with a 5.16 ERA over 96 innings with them.

The Rangers promoted Hernández to the major leagues on August 20, 2019. He made his major league debut on August 21 versus the Los Angeles Angels; pitching  scoreless innings and earning the win. Hernández finished the season with Texas, going 2–1 with a 4.32 ERA and 19 strikeouts over  innings. In 2020, he went 5–1 with a 2.90 ERA and 31 strikeouts over 31 innings for Texas.

On March 9, 2021, Hernández was shut down for at least four weeks after being diagnosed with a "low-grade" sprain of his ulnar collateral ligament in his right elbow. On March 30, 2021, Hernández was placed on the 60-day injured list. On April 12, 2021, Hernández underwent Tommy John surgery and missed the 2021 season. Following completion of rehabilitation assignments, Hernández returned to action for Texas in July 2022. He finished that season after posting a 2–3 record with a 2.97 ERA and 27 strikeouts over  innings.

On January 13, 2023, Hernández agreed to a one-year, $995K contract with the Rangers, avoiding salary arbitration.

Personal life
Hernández's father, Fernando Hernández, pitched in Major League Baseball. Jonathan was born in Memphis, Tennessee, when his father played baseball there, but he was raised in the Dominican Republic.

See also
List of second-generation Major League Baseball players

References

External links

1996 births
Living people
American sportspeople of Dominican Republic descent
Baseball players from Memphis, Tennessee
Major League Baseball pitchers
Texas Rangers players
Dominican Summer League Rangers players
Arizona League Rangers players
Hickory Crawdads players
Down East Wood Ducks players
Frisco RoughRiders players
Round Rock Express players
Águilas Cibaeñas players
American expatriate baseball players in the Dominican Republic